Peter Alexander may refer to:
 Pete Alexander or Grover Cleveland Alexander (1887–1950), American baseball player
 Peter Alexander (Shakespearean scholar) (1893–1969), professor of English language and literature at the University of Glasgow
 Peter Alexander (Austrian performer) (1926–2011)
 Peter Alexander (artist) (1939–2020), American artist
 Peter Alexander (English actor) (born 1952)
 Peter Alexander (fashion designer) (born 1965), Australian fashion designer
 Peter Alexander (journalist) (born 1976), American television journalist

See also